The slender rat (Rattus verecundus) is a species of rodent in the family Muridae.
It is found in West Papua, Indonesia and Papua New Guinea.

Names
It is known as sjang in the Kalam language of Papua New Guinea.

References

Rattus
Rodents of Papua New Guinea
Mammals of Western New Guinea
Mammals described in 1904
Taxonomy articles created by Polbot
Rodents of New Guinea
Taxa named by Oldfield Thomas